Larry Richert (born c. 1960 in Millvale, Pennsylvania) is an American journalist.

Education and career
Born in the Pittsburgh suburb of Millvale, Pennsylvania and raised in nearby McCandless Township, Richert graduated from North Allegheny High School and Clarion University.

He joined KDKA-TV in November 1988 when he was tapped to host "Wake Up with Larry Richert," a half-hour morning show that aired on KDKA-TV from 6:30 to 7 a.m.  Larry graduated from Clarion State College and was a student there from 1977 to 1981, where is had several radio shows on WCUC and WWCH. He was also was announcer for Clarion football.  His major was Communications.  

In June 1990, the station reformatted its morning program to be more newscast-like. Richert offered forecasts, read sports stories and conducted interviews alongside John Shumway, who handled news stories at the anchor desk. Richert was on the morning show for four years before moving to KDKA's "Live at 5" program.

In July 1995, he moved another new position, providing weather forecasts for KDKA's 5, 6 and 11 p.m. news broadcasts, as Bob Kudzma scaled back his duties. He currently hosts the morning news on the sister radio station KDKA-AM, a position he accepted late in 2001.

The KDKA Morning News, hosted by Larry Richert and John Shumway, can be heard weekdays from 6-9 AM on NewsRadio 1020 KDKA. The show is produced by Nick Kratsas, and news is provided by morning anchor Bill Rehkopf and news editor Kate Farrell.

He also co-wrote a movie screenplay with friend John Mowod, Amazing Racer, which completed production in 2012. The movie's cast includes the likes of Daryl Hannah, Julianne Michelle, Eric Roberts, Claire Forlani, Louis Gossett Jr., Jason Gedrick, Michael Madsen, Stephen Colletti, and Charles Durning. The movie is set to release in 2011. Larry is not only a writer, but a co-producer along with John Mowod of the project as well.[IMDB.COM]

References

1960s births
Living people
20th-century American journalists
American male journalists
American radio personalities
Clarion University of Pennsylvania alumni
Journalists from Pennsylvania
People from McCandless, Pennsylvania
People from Millvale, Pennsylvania
Radio personalities from Pittsburgh